Lynn Merrick (born Marilyn Llewelling; November 19, 1919 – March 25, 2007) was an American actress who appeared in over 40 films during the 1940s, mainly for Columbia and Republic Studios.

Early life 
Merrick was born Marilyn Llewelling on November 19, 1919 in Fort Worth, Texas.

Career
In the 1930s, she studied acting and worked as a model after moving to California.

In 1940, she was one of thirteen women selected by the Motion Picture Publicists Association as a "Baby Star", a selection process which was meant to highlight the most promising new film stars. She made the bulk of her films during the 1940s, starring in 22 feature films for Republic Pictures; 16 of these were Don Barry westerns.

Her first Barry film was Two Gun Sheriff, and her last was Fugutive from Senora. She later worked for Columbia Pictures, where she starred in films alongside Richard Dix, Chester Morris, and Warner Baxter. Merrick retired from films after Escape from Terror (1955), starring and directed by Jackie Coogan.

In 1948, Merrick and her husband at the time, Conrad Nagel, appeared in summer stock theater in Pennsylvania, New York, and Connecticut. After retiring from acting, Merrick was an executive with the Barbizon School of Modeling.

Personal life
She was married and divorced twice. Her first marriage was to Nagel. They received an interlocutory decree on March 26, 1947, and the divorce became final on August 26, 1948.

On October 26, 1949, she wed producer Robert Goelet, Jr. in Europe. Both unions were childless. In 1950, Merrick received emergency treatment at Santa Monical Hospital after taking an overdose of sleeping pills. A news story distributed by International News Service described the overdose as "the climax to a spat with her husband, wealthy Robert Goelet."

Merrick was a Democrat and supported Adlai Stevenson's campaign during the 1952 presidential election.

Merrick was of the Baptist faith.

Death
Merrick died on March 25, 2007, aged 87, at her home in West Palm Beach, Florida from undisclosed causes.

She was cremated with her ashes scattered.

Filmography

References

 B-Western Ladies, Lynn Merrick

External links

 
 The Private Life and Times of Lynn Merrick
 

1919 births
2007 deaths
American film actresses
Actresses from Texas
People from Fort Worth, Texas
20th-century American actresses
California Democrats
Texas Democrats
Florida Democrats
Baptists from the United States
20th-century Baptists
21st-century American women